The Paus is a Norwegian family.

Paus may also refer to
 Paus (band), a Swedish band
 Paus (album), a 1998 album by the band
 Paus (Arcadia), a town of ancient Arcadia, Greece
 PAUS, a Portuguese alternative rock band